2,3-Bis(acetylmercaptomethyl)quinoxaline is an antiviral agent which can inhibits poliovirus RNA synthesis in vitro and in vivo and inhibits human herpesvirus 1 multiplication in vitro. It does not interfere with attachment, penetration or DNA synthesis, but interrupts a late stage in virus assembly and/or maturation.

References 

Quinoxalines
Thioesters
Antiviral drugs